Le Solitaire is a 1987 French crime film directed and partly written by Jacques Deray, starring Jean-Paul Belmondo.

Plot 
The policeman Stan Jalard and his colleague Simon Lecache are rather fed up with police work. They are toying with the idea to quit police service in order to run a hotel on the Antilles. Single father Lecache has already asked his son Christian about it. But at the very evening when Lecache tells Jalard that his son approves of their plan, Lecache is murdered by the professional killer Charly Schneider.

Jalard changes his mind. He dedicates his life all the more to police work. After two more years he has been promoted but he had no chance to get Schneider yet because Schneider disappeared. Eventually Schneider returns to France and commits crimes. Moreover, he threatens Jalard on the phone and later devastates his flat. He even sends somebody to shoot Jalard and his godson Christian in the street.

Jalard identifies Schneider's new accomplices and puts them under pressure. Step by step he closes in on him until he can confront him in his hide-out. Schneider refuses to show any regret, eludes and steals a car. He tries to run over Jalard who arrests him anyway. Now that Jalard has brought the murderer of Christian's father to justice, he allows Christian to call him "Dad". He, who has put his godson away into boarding schools all the time and lived only for his police work, now demonstrates a shift in priorities. When they drive home, Jalard puts a police siren on top of his car and drives wiggly lines just because that obviously amuses little Christian a lot.

Cast 
 Jean-Paul Belmondo: Commissaire Stan Jalard  
 Jean-Pierre Malo: Charly Schneider  
 Michel Beaune: inspector Pezzoli  
 Pierre Vernier: Maurin  
 François Dunoyer: René Pignon 
 Michel Creton: Simon Lecache
 Franck Ayas:Christian Lecache, Simon's son
 Bernard Farcy: Brother Carmoni

Production
Belmondo and director Jacques Deray had recently made the highly popular Le Marginal (1983) together and hoped for a similar success. Belmondo had suffered an injury making Hold Up and was unable to do many of his own stunts.

Reception
The film was a box office disappointment and led to the end of the cycle of Belmondo police movies. It also resulted in Belmondo returning to the stage.

References

External links 

Le Solitaire at Le Film Guide

1987 films
1980s crime thriller films
French crime thriller films
Films directed by Jacques Deray
Police detective films
1980s French films